Pope Innocent IV (r. 1243–1254) created fifteen cardinals in two consistories he held during his pontificate; this included his future successors Nicholas III in 1244 and Adrian V in 1251.

28 May 1244

 Pierre de Colmieu
 Guglielmo di Modena O.Carth.
 Eudes de Châteauroux
 Pierre de Bar
 Guillaume de Talliante O.S.B. Clun.
 John of Toledo O.Cist.
 Hugues de Saint-Cher O.P.
 Goffredo da Trani
 Ottaviano Ubaldini
 Pietro Capocci
 Giovanni Gaetano Orsini
 Guglielmo Fieschi
 Otto of Tonengo, transferred from San Nicola in Carcere to Porto e Santa Rufina

December 1251

 Giacomo da Castell'arquato
 István Báncsa
 Ottobono Fieschi

Notes and references

Sources

College of Cardinals
Innocent IV
Innocent
Pope Innocent IV